Pincher Creek Airport  is located  northwest of Pincher Creek, Alberta, Canada.

References

External links

Place to Fly on COPA's Places to Fly airport directory

Registered aerodromes in Alberta
Municipal District of Pincher Creek No. 9